My Little Pony: Pony Life is an animated children's television series based on Hasbro's My Little Pony franchise. The series is produced by Entertainment One, in collaboration with Boulder Media. The series is the successor and spin-off to 2010's My Little Pony: Friendship Is Magic and the fourth animated series based on the franchise overall. The series features a new animation style, setting and comedic tone. The series premiered on Treehouse TV in Canada on June 21, 2020 and on Discovery Family in the United States on November 7, 2020. A second season was announced before the series made its debut in the United States. The second season premiered on Tiny Pop in the UK on April 2, 2021, and in the United States on Discovery Family, following it on April 10, 2021.

Series overview

Episodes

Season 1 (2020–21)

Season 2 (2021)

Shorts

See also 
 List of My Little Pony: Friendship Is Magic episodes

Notes

References

External links 
 
 Two Episodes of Pony Life Possibly Revaled "The Best of the Worst" and "Princess Probz" - June 13th Airdate
 Two New Episodes of Pony Life Possibly Revealed: How Applejack Got Her Hat Back and Cute-Pocalypse Meow
 Yet Two More Pony Life Episode Titles and Synopses Appear: Bad Thing No 3 and Pinkie Pie: Hyper Helper
 More Pony Life Episodes Revealed - #7 -The Trial Less Trotten; Death of a Sales-Pony / #8 - Bighoof Walking; The Fluttershy Effect

Lists of American children's animated television series episodes